Tankovo is a village in  South-East Bulgaria, situated in Obshtina Nessebar, in the Burgas region. As of 2007, it has 1,185 residents.

Villages in Burgas Province